King Kurt are a rock-n-roll band from the UK. They formed in 1981 and split up in 1988, although they have reformed sporadically and played a reunion concert in 2010.  They are best known for their hit single, "Destination Zululand" (1983).

Formation
The band began as Rockin' Kurt and his Sauer Krauts in 1981, with Jeff Harvey on vocals, John Reddington on guitar, Bert Boustead on bass guitar, Alan "Maggot" Power on "saxamaphone" and Rory Lyons on drums. Paul "Thwack" Laventhol joined on guitar at their third gig in July 1981, and the name was shortened to King Kurt later that year.

Notoriety
Harvey left in 1982 to be replaced by Gary "The Smeg" Clayton as vocalist, and it was at Harvey's farewell concert at the 101 Club in Battersea, London that the infamous "food fight" gigs started. The band were known for their stage performances in which eggs and bags of flour were thrown around both on and off stage. Free haircuts and other audience participation included stage props such as "The Wheel of Misfortune", a wheel on which a fan was strapped and fed Snakebite through a tube. Themed concerts included "Kurt Skirts", where admittance was refused to men unless wearing a skirt, or Easter concerts with the band dressed as legionaries, angels on flying trapeze, and an extra in a loincloth on a cross at the back of the stage.

Albums
The band joined Stiff Records in 1983 and recorded the album Ooh Wallah Wallah with producer, Dave Edmunds.  They had a few minor hit singles that featured in the UK Singles and UK Indie Charts, such as "Zulu Beat", Weill and Brecht's "Mack the Knife" and "Banana Banana", along with their Top 40 hit "Destination Zululand", which reached No. 36 in the UK Singles Chart in October 1983.

Their second album, Big Cock, was produced by Phil Wainman and released on Polydor in 1986.

Post-heyday
During 1988 the band split, though between 1992 and 1996 the group, featuring three of the original members, were performing as a live act. John Reddington has been a solicitor and trademark lawyer for two decades. Smeg performed as 'I Can't Believe It's Not King Kurt'. A compilation album was issued in 2009, and a reunion concert took place in March 2010. In 2012 they were confirmed to play the Olympia 1 and 2 at the Rebellion Festival in Blackpool on the same bill as Conflict, Subhumans and Stiff Little Fingers. In 2017 the band were booked to play several gigs in the north of the UK.

Discography

Singles

Albums

Compilation albums

See also
List of psychobilly bands

References

External links

[ King Kurt biography] at Allmusic website

British psychobilly musical groups
Musical groups established in 1981
Musical groups disestablished in 1988
English punk rock groups
Stiff Records artists